The 1815 French legislative election can refer to two separate elections. In May, an election was held under the Charter of 1815 under Napoleon Bonaparte's restored empire.  A second election was held in August under the Bourbon Restoration government.

 May 1815 French legislative election
 August 1815 French legislative election

1815 elections in France